We Are Peru – Purple Party (SP-PM) was a parliamentary group of the 2021–2026 Congress of the Republic of Peru formed by the representatives of the political parties We Are Peru and Purple Party. It was created on 23 July 2021 and legalized on July 25. The group was disbanded on 12 November 2021

Composition

References

2021 disestablishments in Peru
2021 establishments in Peru
Defunct political party alliances in Peru
Political parties disestablished in 2021
Political parties established in 2021